Paris Saint-Germain Rugby League, commonly known as Paris Saint-Germain and familiarly as PSG Rugby League or PSG RL, was a French professional rugby league club founded in 1995, and based in the city of Paris in France. The club was the rugby league department of Paris Saint-Germain until 1997.

PSG Rugby League played in the highest tier of European rugby league football, the Super League. Stade Sébastien Charléty in Paris, with a seating capacity of 20,000 spectators, was their home ground. However, the capital club played once at Parc des Sports et de l'Amitié in Narbonne.

PSG RL débuted against Sheffield Eagles at the Charléty in front of 17,873 spectators on March 29, 1996, with a team composed of a mixture of French, Australian and New Zealand players. An initiative from former French rugby union player and manager Jacques Fouroux, the Super League project lasted only two seasons (1996 and 1997), in which PSG RL also played in the 1997 Challenge Cup, 1997 World Club Challenge and the 1997 Premiership Trophy.

A scandal over undeclared contracts led to the dissolution of PSG Rugby League in September 1997. PSG RL played its last match against Salford Reds in the Premiership Trophy on September 7, 1997.

History

1996 season

Paris Saint-Germain Rugby League was officially founded as the rugby league department of parent club Paris Saint-Germain on December 23, 1995. Led by Jacques Fouroux, PSG RL became the only foreign club in the Super League, at the time it was exclusively composed of English teams.

Fouroux pre-selected 40 players in the French championship, before announcing the final list of 26 players, with 9 foreigners (Australians, New Zealanders, Samoans, but also a Moldavian and a Pole). Darren Adams, former Racing 92 player, was the star of the team.

On March 29, 1996, PSG Rugby League, managed by Michel Mazaré and assisted by David Ellis, made its Super League debut with a 30–24 victory over Sheffield Eagles at Stade Sébastien Charléty in front of 17,873 spectators. However, the rest of the season wouldn't be as successful. PSG RL was given a reality check by Wigan Warriors (8–76), leading to a downward spiral of 11 defeats in a row.

The catastrophic season saw the capital club finish 11th (out of 12) with only 3 wins and a draw in 22 games, while club president Jacques Fouroux resigned from all his duties at PSG on September 1, 1996, leaving the club in debt and facing an uncertain future.

1997 season

PSG Rugby League, led by new club president Jacques Larrose, almost missed out on its second Super League season due to budget problems. The club had originally envisioned a 13 million francs budget, but fell short. To make up for the missing 5 million francs, PSG RL had to settle for just three French players (Pascal Bomati, club captain Pierre Chamorin and Fabien Devecchi) in the squad now managed by the Australian Peter Mulholland.

As odd as it was beginning the season in the 1997 Challenge Cup (an English cup competition), even more incredible was the fact that PSG's squad consisted of 22 foreign players (21 Australians, one New Zealander) and only two of them were present the previous season: Deon Bird and Jason Sands. And just like its first season, PSG RL started with a win over Sheffield Eagles (18–4) before a series of defeats derailed its ambitions.

Even though PSG defeated rock-bottom Castleford Tigers (13–8), English manager Andy Goodway was brought in to replace Mulholland. In June, the club took part in the 1997 World Club Challenge, and against all odds came out on top against Australian team Western Reds (24–0) at the Stade Sébastien Charléty. PSG RL followed up with mixed displays in the Super League: a win over Halifax (14–12) and then a loss to Castleford (8–20).

In July, PSG returned to Australia for a disappointing second leg of the World Club Challenge before creating a major shock by dominating Wigan Warriors (30–28) in the Super League, one of the best English clubs at the time, in Charléty. A scandal followed, unfortunately. Two PSG board members in dispute with the Super League denounced the contracts of some club players (mostly the Australians) to the authorities. Instead of employment contracts, these players had tourist visas to avoid paying certain taxes in France.

Even though the club, once again, finished 11th (out of 12) in the Super League, its statistics had improved with 6 wins in 22 games. However, the scandal led to the dissolution of PSG Rugby League just a week after the end of the Super League. On September 7, 1997, PSG RL played its last match against Salford Red Devils in the 1997 Premiership Trophy.

Seasons

Only Super League matches.

Competitive record

As of the 1997 season.

Notable former players

As of the 1997 season.

 Darren Adams
 Jerome Azema
 Frédéric Banquet
 Troy Bellamy
 Phil Bergman
 Deon Bird
 Vea Bloomfield
 Pascal Bomati
 John Boslem
 Hadji Boudebza
 Todd Brown
 Justin Bryant
 Didier Cabestany
 Laurent Cambres
 Arnaud Cervello
 Pierre Chamorin
 Alexandre Couttet
 Nicolas Couttet
 David Despin
 Fabien Devecchi
 Thierry Devergie
 James Durkin
 Jason Eade
 Abderazak El Khalouki
 Patrick Entat
 Paul Evans
 Kirby Faciane
 Jonathan Griffiths
 Anthony Hancock
 Michael Hogue
 Nicholas Hyde
 Pascal Jampy
 Gregory Kacala
 Jason Keough
 Mark Lane
 David Lomax
 Laurent Lucchese
 Shaun Mahoney
 Jason Martin
 Craig Menkins
 Wilfried Moulinec
 Matt O'Connor
 David O'Donnell
 Jamie Olejnik
 Jules Parry
 Regis Pastre-Courtine
 Jacques Pech
 Adam Peters
 Mikhail Piskunov
 Anthony Priddle
 Jean-Luc Ramandou
 Philippe Ricard
 Jeremy Robinson
 Ian Russell
 Jason Sands
 Phillip Shead
 Wayne Sing
 Daniel Smith
 Romain Sort
 Romain Taylor
 Frederic Teixido
 Patrick Torreilles
 Ian Turner
 Gregory Tutard
 Eric Van Brussel
 Eric Vergniol
 Anthony "Tony" Wall
 George Wilson
 Vincent Wulf
 Bagdad Yaha
 Ronel Zenon

Personnel

As of the 1997 season.

Presidents

Managers

References

External links

Official websites
PSG.FR - Site officiel du Paris Saint-Germain

 
Paris Saint-Germain F.C.
Super League teams
French rugby league teams
Defunct rugby league teams in France
1995 establishments in France
1997 disestablishments in France
Rugby clubs established in 1995
Sports clubs in Paris